Rugby union is a relatively minor sport in Afghanistan, but is increasing in popularity. Afghanistan's current indigenous rugby sides formed in 2011, and played their first match barefoot against New Zealand Special Air Service troops in Kabul's green zone. The country's first official rugby tournament was sponsored by the British embassy in December 2011. The Afghan team's first overseas match was played as an exhibition rugby sevens match against the United Arab Emirates national team's development side on 27 April 2012, and played in the Bournemouth Sevens Festival at the Bournemouth Sports Club in June 2012.

A sevens national team played its first match in 2018.

Governing body

The Afghanistan Rugby Federation (ARF) registered with the National Olympic Committee, Islamic Republic Of Afghanistan, in 2010. It is the official body for the sport of Afghan Rugby and is involved in educating, supporting and enabling young Afghans to excel and compete internationally. The ARF officially launched rugby in Afghanistan on May 20, 2011.

Afghanistan Rugby Federation is in process of developing into a nationwide organization which will certainly promote the game of rugby and the accompanying spirit of teamwork and fair competition in between all age-groups throughout Afghanistan emphasizing the young generation of Afghanistan. Asad Ziar, Chief Executive Officer states that rugby will only thrive if it becomes a game played by a large number of young generations.

History	 

As with many parts of the world, Afghanistan has indigenous sports which bear some resemblance to rugby. One of these is buzkashi, which has been compared to a cross between rugby and polo, using a dead goat or calf as the ball.

In most of Afghan history, the only ones to play Western rugby in Afghanistan were foreigners. The game was first introduced into the country from British India and was played by British troops. After the British left Asia, the game all but died in Afghanistan. Following the 2001 invasion of Afghanistan, rugby was reintroduced by foreign forces, being played amongst NATO and Australian soldiers on their bases.

Gallery

References

External links

Afghan Rugby Federation